Kaushaliya Virjibhai Vaghela is an Australian politician. She was a member of the Victorian Legislative Council from 2018 to 2022, representing the Western Metropolitan Region. She was the first Indian-born member of the Victorian Parliament, and is a Hindu. Before her preselection in 2018, she worked as a part-time adviser to then-State Minister for Multicultural Affairs, Robin Scott.

Resignation from the ALP
On 9 February 2022, Vaghela crossed the floor in support of Adem Somyurek's motion to refer the government to the Victorian Ombudsman in relation to the alleged misuse of taxpayer funds, involving the diversion of parliamentary staffing resources to political campaigning and party factional activities prior to the 2014 Victorian state election.

In March 2022, Vaghela resigned from the ALP, making serious allegations of bullying against the party. Her criticisms were aired after she had been left off the Labor ticket for the 2022 state election, following an investigation by the Independent Broad-based Anti-corruption Commission (IBAC) into the conduct of her husband and staff members.

New Democrats party

In July 2022, Vaghela announced that she had formed the New Democrats party, with her as its secretary. After the party gained registration with the Victorian Electoral Commission in October 2022, she claimed that almost 2,000 people had joined in response to her appeal for support. 

Vaghela was defeated at the 2022 state election, polling 0.5%. The New Democrats polled 0.2% across Victoria.

See also
 Gaurav Sharma (similar case in New Zealand)

References

Year of birth missing (living people)
Living people
Australian Labor Party members of the Parliament of Victoria
Members of the Victorian Legislative Council
Women members of the Victorian Legislative Council
Indian emigrants to Australia
Australian Hindus
People from Jamnagar
21st-century Australian politicians
21st-century Australian women politicians